Agyneta ripariensis is a species of sheet weaver found in Russia. It was described by Tanasevitch in 1984.

References

ripariensis
Spiders of Russia
Spiders described in 1984